Narjeh (also Romanized as Nerjeh; also known as Nīrja) is a city in the Central District of Takestan County, Qazvin Province, Iran. At the 2006 census its population was 5,604, in 1,661 families. The common language in Narjeh is Azerbaijani Turkish. Among the sights of Narjeh, we can mention the ancient hill of Nargeh and the tomb of Imamzadeh Zarlan.

References 

Populated places in Takestan County
Cities in Qazvin Province